LEDDAR (Light-Emitting Diode Detection And Ranging) is a proprietary technology owned by LeddarTech. It uses the time of flight of light signals and signal processing algorithms to detect, locate, and measure objects in its field of view.

Technology

The Leddar technology is like a light-based radar that sends very short light pulses of invisible light about 100,000 times per second to actively illuminate an area of interest. 
The sensor captures the light backscattered from objects (either fixed or moving) over its detection area, and processes the signals to precisely map their location and other attributes. 
The data is compiled thousands of times per second, providing up to a few hundred frames per second and offering accurate and reliable information even in adverse weather and lighting conditions.

The multi-channel sensor also provides lateral discrimination of detected objects and this feature, with 3D measurements, provides the basis for object tracking.

Examples of Leddar Applications

Smart Cities

 Traffic light and intersection management 
 Vehicle traffic flow monitoring 
 Parking space occupancy management 
 Automated highway toll 
 Vehicle size monitoring and profiling 
 Speed-limit enforcement 
 Water-level monitoring 
 Smart lighting applications 
 Public space and building security

Smart Vehicles

 Collision warning and avoidance
 Obstacle detection
 Assisted driving (blind spots, parking, automatic cruise control)
 Unmanned vehicles, drones and UAV navigation assistance
 Heavy machinery  and truck safety, as well as perimeter control
 Transportation vehicles’ bulk material levels (solids, liquids)
 Height and distance measurements

Smart Homes and Buildings

 Indoor security and surveillance (presence, movement, intrusion)
 Outdoor security and surveillance (perimeter intrusion)
 Occupancy sensing
 Touchless and remote controls (water faucets, lighting, etc.)
 Presence detection in unauthorized areas
 Autonomous robotic appliance navigation and collision avoidance

Smart Industries and Agriculture

 Mobile equipment and robot navigation
 Vehicle collision avoidance
 Machine safety (distance measurements, perimeter intrusion)
 Security and surveillance (presence, movement, intrusion)
 Smart level metering in tanks and reservoirs
 Bulk material volume estimates
 Silos, tanks, and reservoir level measurements
 Touchless remote controls (water faucets, lighting, etc.)

See also

Time of flight

Rangefinder

Laser rangefinder

LIDAR

Sonar

Radar

References

External links
 www.leddartech.com
 www.ino.ca

Light-emitting diodes
Measuring instruments